Veysel Sarı (born 25 July 1988) is a Turkish professional footballer who plays as a right back for Süper Lig club Antalyaspor.

Club career

Galatasaray
On 4 February 2014, Veysel joined Galatasaray signing a contract which will keep him at the club until 2018. He made his debut against Tokatspor on 5 February 2014, netting a goal, in a 3–0 win for the campaign's Turkish Cup.

Veysel made his league debut on 8 February 2014 against his former team Eskişehirspor, coming in as a substitute in a 3–0 win home.

International career
On 28 May 2013, Veysel was selected for the first time to full team by coach Abdullah Avci, for friendly games against Slovenia and Latvia.

Career statistics

Club

International goals
Scores and results table. Turkey's goal tally first:

Honours
Galatasaray
Türkiye Kupası: 2013–14

References

External links
 
 
 Guardian Stats Centre
 
 

1988 births
Living people
Association football fullbacks
Turkish footballers
Turkey B international footballers
Turkey international footballers
Süper Lig players
Galatasaray S.K. footballers
Eskişehirspor footballers
Kasımpaşa S.K. footballers